Maria Leopoldine of Austria-Tyrol (6 April 1632 – 7 August 1649), was by birth Archduchess of Austria and member of the Tyrolese branch of the House of Habsburg and by marriage the second spouse of her first cousin, Holy Roman Emperor Ferdinand III. As such, she was Empress of the Holy Roman Empire, German Queen and Queen consort of Hungary and Bohemia. She died in childbirth.

Life

Early years 

Maria Leopoldine was born in Innsbruck on 6 April 1632 as the third (but second surviving) daughter and the fifth and youngest child of Leopold V, Archduke of Further Austria, and Claudia de' Medici. Her father died on 13 September 1632, when she was five months old. On her father's side, her grandparents were Charles II, Archduke of Inner Austria and his wife and niece Princess Maria Anna of Bavaria and on her mother's side her grandparents were Ferdinando I de' Medici, Grand Duke of Tuscany and his wife Princess Christina of Lorraine. In addition to her full-siblings, she had an older half-sister, Vittoria della Rovere, born from her mother's first marriage with Federico Ubaldo della Rovere, Duke of Urbino.

Maria Leopoldine's oldest brother, Ferdinand Charles, inherited Further Austria, but Dowager Archduchess Claudia assumed regency because of her son's minority. In a letter written to his mother, Elizabeth of England, on 8 September 1641, Charles Louis of the Palatinate (later Elector Palatine) described the intentions of his uncle, King Charles I of England, and Maria Leopoldine's first cousin, Holy Roman Emperor Ferdinand III, to arrange a marriage between the 9-years-old Archduchess and himself; the marriage between them was to end "all grudges betweene our families". However, the union never took place.

Marriage and death 

In Linz on 2 July 1648 Maria Leopoldine married the widowed Holy Roman Emperor Ferdinand III, thereby becoming Empress of the Holy Roman Empire, Queen of the Germans, Queen of Hungary and Queen of Bohemia. The wedding ceremony was splendid; The composer Andreas Rauch celebrated the marriage as "anticipating (with the help of Divine Providence) the most beautiful end of the Thirty Years' War" and an opera titled I Trionfi d'Amore, produced by Giovanni Felice Sances, was meant to commemorate the event, but the Prague premiere was canceled at the last moment when King Vladislaus IV of Poland (Ferdinand III's brother-in-law) died within two months of the wedding; the planned Pressburg performance apparently never took place. The new Empress was as closely related to her husband as her cousin and predecessor, Maria Anna of Spain; both marriages were means by which the House of Habsburg, from time to time, reinforced itself.

Soon after her wedding, Maria Leopoldine became pregnant, and was depicted as such in the 1649 painting by the Italian painter and poet Lorenzo Lippi. The Imperial couple's only child, Archduke Charles Joseph of Austria, was born on 7 August 1649. The childbirth was extremely difficult, ending in the death of the 17-year-old Empress. Her husband remarried within two years, while their son died childless aged 14. She is buried in tomb 21 in the Imperial Crypt in Vienna. The writer Wolf Helmhardt, Baron von Hohberg, then at the beginning of his career, sent to Emperor Ferdinand III a poem written in honour of the late Empress, called "Poem of tears" (de: Klag-Gedicht).

Ancestry

References

Further reading 

Sir Frederick Dixon Hartland: A chronological dictionary or index to the genealogical chart, London: Charles and Edwin Layton 1854, 123 p. [retrieved 3 November 2016].
C. von Wurzbach: Maria Leopoldina von Österreich, Biographisches Lexikon des Kaiserthums Oesterreich, Vienna Kaiserlich-königliche Hof- und Staatsdruckerei 1861, 458 p.
 Bettina Braun, Katrin Keller, Matthias Schnettger: Nur die Frau des Kaisers?: Kaiserinnen in der Frühen Neuzeit, Böhlau ed., Vienna 2016 .
 Gigi Beutler: Die Kaisergruft, Wien 1993
 Richard Reifenscheid: Die Habsburger. Von Rudolf I. bis Karl I.; Verlag Styria Graz/Wien/Köln 1982,

Royal titles 

|-

1632 births
1649 deaths
Holy Roman Empresses
17th-century House of Habsburg
German queens consort
Bohemian queens consort
Austrian royal consorts
Deaths in childbirth
Hungarian queens consort
17th-century Austrian women
People from Innsbruck
17th-century women of the Holy Roman Empire
Burials at the Imperial Crypt
Royal reburials
Wives of Ferdinand III, Holy Roman Emperor
Daughters of monarchs